Theobald the Great (1090–1152) was count of Blois and of Chartres as Theobald IV from 1102 and was count of Champagne and of Brie as Theobald II from 1125. Theobald held Auxerre, Maligny, Ervy, Troyes and Châteauvillain as fiefs from Odo II, Duke of Burgundy.

Career
Theobald was the son of Count Stephen II of Blois and his wife Adela of Normandy (daughter of William the Conqueror), and the elder brother of King Stephen of England. Although he was the second son, Theobald was appointed above his older brother William. Theobald accompanied his mother throughout their domain on hundreds of occasions and, after her retirement to Marcigney in 1125, he administered the family properties with great skill. Adela died in her beloved convent on 8 March 1137, the year after her son Stephen was crowned king of England.

King Louis VII of France became involved in a war with Theobald by permitting Count Raoul I of Vermandois and seneschal of France, to repudiate his wife Eleanor, Theobald's sister, and to marry Petronilla of Aquitaine, sister of Louis VII's wife, Eleanor. The war, which lasted two years (1142–1144), was marked by the occupation of Champagne by the royal army and the capture of Vitry-le-François, where 1500 people perished in the deliberate burning of the church by Louis. The scholastic Pierre Abélard, famous for his love affair with and subsequent marriage to his student Héloïse d'Argenteuil, sought asylum in Champagne during Theobald II's reign. Abelard died at Cluny Abbey in Burgundy, a monastery supported by the Thebaudians for many centuries.

Marriage and issue
In 1123 he married Matilda, daughter of Duke Engelbert of Carinthia. Their children were:
 Henry I of Champagne, count of Champagne
 Theobald V of Blois, count of Blois and seneschal of France
 Adela, queen of France as the wife of King Louis VII of France
 Isabella, married 1. Duke Roger III of Apulia d. 1148,  2. William Gouet IV d. 1170 
 Marie, married Duke Odo II of Burgundy, became abbess of Fontevrault later in life.
 Stephen I of Sancerre 1133–1191, count of Sancerre and crusader, died at the Siege of Acre
 William White Hands, 1135–1202, archbishop of Reims 1176–1202, Cardinal 1179
 Agnes (d. 1207), dame de Ligny, married Renaut II of Bar (d. 1170).
 Margaret, nun at Fontevrault
 Matilda, wife of Rotrou IV of Perche

Theobald had an illegitimate son, Hugh, (d.1171), abbot of Lagny near Paris.

See also
Peace with honor

References

Sources

House of Blois
Counts of Champagne
Counts of Blois
Counts of Chartres
Medieval child monarchs
1090 births
1152 deaths